The 1936 All-Ireland Senior Hurling Championship was the 50th staging of the All-Ireland hurling championship since its establishment by the Gaelic Athletic Association in 1887. The championship began on 26 April 1936 and ended on 6 September 1936.

Kilkenny entered the championship as defending champions, however, they were defeated by Limerick in the All-Ireland final on a score line of 5–6 to 1–5 victory.

Teams

A total of thirteen teams contested the championship, however, there were some changes from the 1935 championship. Wexford declined to field a team in Leinster, while in Munster Kerry reentered the championship after a long absence.

Team summaries

Results

Leinster Senior Hurling Championship

Munster Senior Hurling Championship

First round

Second round

Semi-final

Final

All-Ireland Senior Hurling Championship

Championship statistics

Miscellaneous

 The All-Ireland semi-final between Limerick and Galway is suspended ten minutes into the second half when a melee develops and a Galway player is knocked unconscious. At a subsequent meeting of the Gaelic Athletic Association's (GAA) Central Council, Limerick were awarded the match as Galway were suspended from the championship.

Sources

 Corry, Eoghan, The GAA Book of Lists (Hodder Headline Ireland, 2005).
 Donegan, Des, The Complete Handbook of Gaelic Games (DBA Publications Limited, 2005).

External links
1936 All-Ireland Senior Hurling Championship results

References

1936